Sergio Realini (June 24, 1925 – December 20, 1990) was an Italian professional football player.

References

1925 births
1990 deaths
A.C. Legnano players
Treviso F.B.C. 1993 players
Association football defenders
Calcio Lecco 1912 players
Inter Milan players
Italian footballers
Serie A players
S.S.D. Sanremese Calcio players
U.S. Lecce players
S.S.D. Varese Calcio players